Lieutenant General Premindra Singh Bhagat, PVSM, VC (14 October 1918 – 23 May 1975) was a general in the Indian Army and an Indian recipient of the Victoria Cross, the highest and most prestigious award for gallantry in the face of the enemy that can be awarded to British and Commonwealth forces. The Victoria Cross was conferred on him for his actions in the Sudan Theatre during World War II.

Bhagat was an alumnus of the famous Prince of Wales Royal Indian Military College, Dehradun.

Early life and education
Bhagat was born on 13 October 1918 in Gorakhpur, British India to Surendra Singh Bhagat, an executive engineer in the provincial government of the then United Provinces. His mother died in 1927. In 1930, he entered the Royal Indian Military College, a military school in Dehradun, where he was an average student. In June 1937, he entered the Indian Military Academy. As a gentleman cadet, Bhagat captained the academy tennis and squash teams. While noted by his instructors as an intelligent all-round sportsman, he was also described as a careless student. In January 1938, Surendra Singh Bhagat died in a riding accident in Varanasi.

Military career
Bhagat applied himself to his studies in his final year and was commissioned in the British Indian Army on 15 July 1939 as a Second lieutenant (2Lt.) in the Royal Bombay Sappers and Miners. He was posted to the 21 Field Company of Engineers at Pune in September, shortly after war began in Europe.

World War II
On 23 September 1940, Bhagat's company was sent to East Africa, as part of the 10th Indian Infantry Brigade, 5th Indian Division, Sudan Defence Force under the overall command of Lieutenant General William Platt. The 10th Infantry Brigade was commanded by Brigadier William Slim, MC (later Field Marshal the Viscount Slim). On 6 November, Slim launched an attack on the fort of Gallabat, with the assault spearheaded by the 3rd Royal Garhwal Rifles, under Lieutenant-Colonel S.E. Taylor. Gallabat was captured, but an enemy counterattack forced the brigade to withdraw. The Sappers were tasked with obstructing the enemy to prevent them from following too closely. At one stage, two broken-down tanks were filled with explosives and placed on a culvert to collapse it and halt the enemy. The charges were detonated, but one tank failed to explode, and the culvert did not collapse. With the enemy closing in, Bhagat dashed out from under cover and, with bullets flying all around him, detonated the remaining explosives and collapsed the culvert. For his heroism, he was recommended for a Military Cross, but it was downgraded to a mentioned in dispatches. After the brigade was relieved by 9th Indian Infantry Brigade in mid-November, it readied for the Battle of Keren.

On 31 January 1941, a mobile column of 3/12 Royal Frontier Force Rifles, including a detachment of 21 Field Company under Second Lieutenant Bhagat, was sent on a reconnaissance mission towards Metemma. Bhagat's Bren carrier passed through a heavily-mined stretch of road and detonated two mines, the second of which destroyed the carrier and killed the driver and a sapper. Bhagat then continued in another carrier and defused mines by hand as the column moved down the road. Under close enemy fire and without food or rest, he worked for four days, clearing a total of 15 minefields over a distance of 55 miles. After having another Bren carrier blown up under him on 2 February, which resulted in punctured eardrums, he was relieved of further duties and evacuated to Khartoum for treatment. He was decorated with the Victoria Cross later that month and presented with the ribbon by General Wavell (later Field Marshal the Earl Wavell), the Commander-in-Chief, India in June at Asmara and formally invested with the decoration by the Governor-General of India, Lord Linlithgow, at Viceroy's House in Delhi on 10 November.

Victoria Cross
At 22, the Second Lieutenant (King's Commissioned Indian Officer) in the Corps of Indian Engineers, Indian Army, attd. Royal Bombay Sappers and Miners during the Second World War when the following deed took place for which he was awarded the Victoria Cross:

 
On 24 February 1942 in Pune, Bhagat married Mohini Bhandari (b. 1923), the daughter of a colonel in the Indian Army Medical Corps. He spent the remainder of the war away from the front, first as a successful recruiting officer for the Bombay Sappers and then as the commanding officer of 484 Field Company. In mid-1943, the unit was posted to Chhindwara in the Central Provinces for training in jungle warfare for the war in Burma. In January 1945, Bhagat was nominated to attend a course at Camberley Staff College and became one of the first two Indian officers to attend Staff College in the United Kingdom. At the end of the war in August 1945, Bhagat returned to India and attended a course at the School of Military Engineering at Roorkee. He then returned to England in June 1946 to complete a further engineering course and was promoted to substantive captain on 1 July 1946, returning to India in June 1947. Bhagat was the highest decorated officer in the Indian Army at Indian independence.

Post-Independence
After his return to India, Major Bhagat was assigned to the Punjab Boundary Force under Major General Thomas Wynford Rees, trying to maintain law and order in the chaotic region following Indian independence and Partition in August. On 1 September, after the dissolution of the Punjab Boundary Force, Bhagat was promoted to acting lieutenant-colonel and appointed CO of the Royal Engineers, 4th Infantry Division. In July 1948, Bhagat was posted as GSO 1 at the Armed Forces Academy. On 15 February 1949, he was appointed Commandant of the Bombay Sappers at Pune, and he was promoted to substantive major on 28 August 1951. In 1954, he was promoted to lieutenant-colonel and assigned as the Chief Instructor (Army Wing) at the Defence Services Staff College at Wellington. He was promoted to acting brigadier on 11 March 1957 and assigned command of 165 Infantry Brigade at Ramgarh.

He was posted to Army headquarters on 29 August 1959 as Director of Military Intelligence. During his tenure, Bhagat completed a thorough assessment of the Chinese Army's threat to India, but his report was not heeded before the 1962 Sino-Indian War. He was promoted to colonel on 2 February 1959, and to substantive brigadier on 28 August 1961. From June 1961 to May 1962, Bhagat took the National Defence College course and was then posted as Commandant of the Indian Military Academy (IMA). As Commandant of the IMA, he co-authored (with Lieutenant General T. B. Henderson Brooks) the Henderson Brooks-Bhagat Report, an incisive "Operations Review" of the Indian Army during the Sino-Indian War. The report, initially suppressed and still classified top secret, soon led to sweeping changes in the army. On 29 January 1963, Bhagat was appointed Brigadier General Staff (BGS) for an army corps.

General Officer
Promoted acting major-general on 14 May 1963, he was appointed Chief of Staff (COS) for Eastern Command. He was appointed GOC of a mountain division on 18 September 1964, and promoted to major-general in 1965. He was promoted to the rank of lieutenant general op on 19 May 1967, and subsequently took over as the General Officer Commanding-in-Chief (GOC-in-C) of the Central Command on 4 August 1970. In June 1972, he became the first GOC-in-C of the re-established Northern Command, in Udhampur, Jammu and Kashmir. He was also awarded the Param Vishisht Seva Medal (PVSM).

In January 1973, the Chief of the Army Staff (COAS), Field Marshal Sam Manekshaw was to relinquish office. Although Manekshaw's choice of successor was Lieutenant General Bhagat, however, Lt General Bewoor was senior to Bhagat, but Bhagat could still conceivably become army chief when Bewoor was to retire on his 58th birthday.  But, the Government extended Bewoor's tenure by nine months to give him a full two years on the job.  By many that was construed as a deliberate manipulation to deny Bhagat the position of COAS.  That decision resulted effectively to end Bhagat's army career, as he retired naturally a few months later.  Bhagat was a strong General who was also very popular in the army.

Post-retirement
In July 1974, he became Chairman of the Damodar Valley Corporation, a major electric utility company. He arranged to remain in army service while he headed DVC. During his tenure, DVC increased its power production from 45 MW to 700 MW, and its morale and productivity improved greatly.
 However, after only ten months at DVC, Bhagat died on 23 May 1975 of anaphylactic shock after an injection of penicillin, to which he was allergic, by a careless military doctor. His wife, Mohini Bhagat, presented Bhagat's medals, including his Victoria Cross, to the museum of the Bombay Sappers in Pune on 1 February 1976, where they remain on display.

Legacy
The Indian Army has dedicated a Chair of Excellence in his memory at the United Service Institution of India (USI).

Dates of rank

See also
 East African Campaign (World War II)

Notes

References

Sources
Monuments to Courage (David Harvey, 1999)
The Register of the Victoria Cross (This England, 1997)
The Sapper VCs (Gerald Napier, 1998)

Further reading
Second Lieutenant Premindar Singh Bhagat in The Art of War exhibition at the UK National Archives
Premindra Singh Bhagat

Indian World War II recipients of the Victoria Cross
British Indian Army officers
1918 births
1975 deaths
Indian generals
Rashtriya Indian Military College alumni
People from Gorakhpur
Indian military personnel of the Indo-Pakistani War of 1971
Respiratory disease deaths in India
Deaths from anaphylaxis
Recipients of the Param Vishisht Seva Medal
Indian Military Academy alumni
Commandants of Indian Military Academy
Academic staff of the Defence Services Staff College